Garfunkel's were a small chain of restaurants in London. It was founded in 1979 by Phillip Kaye, and was part of the Restaurant Group. 

On 3 June 2020, during the COVID-19 pandemic in the United Kingdom, Restaurant Group told employees a "large number" of its Garfunkel's outlets would not reopen after lockdown.

References

Restaurant chains in the United Kingdom